A shoe dryer or boot dryer is a machine used for drying shoes, and usually functions by blowing air on the inside of the shoes. The airflow causes the shoes to dry faster. The air can be heated for even faster drying, and these are the most common types. Shoes dryers can be especially useful for people who often have wet shoes, such as families with small children or people who often hike outdoor in the nature. Many shoes dryers have a timer which shuts off the dryer after some time. There are also shoe dryers which instead use a heated grate which the shoes are placed on top of, and which do not blow air.

History 
Several patents have been awarded for shoe dryers, with some of the oldest dating back to 1963.

Safety 
Shoe dryers with heating can be a fire hazard if left on for too long, and should therefore be used under supervision. Many fan driven shoe dryers also emit bothersome noise during use.

See also 
 Dehumidifier
 Drying cabinet

References 

Home appliances